Babakina is a genus of sea slugs, aeolid nudibranchs, marine gastropod mollusks in the superfamily Flabellinoidea. The genus is named after the Japanese malacologist Kikutaro Baba (1905-2001).

Taxonomy 
Babakina is in the subfamily Babakininae within the family Flabellinidae in the taxonomy of the Gastropoda by Bouchet & Rocroi, (2005). Babakina is the type genus of the subfamily Babakininae.

Gosliner et al. (2007) have elevated Babakinidae to the family level with the only genus Babakina.

Species
There are four species within the genus Babakina:
 Babakina anadoni (Ortea, 1979)
 Babakina caprinsulensis (Miller, 1974)
 Babakina festiva (Roller, 1972) - type species
 Babakina indopacifica Gosliner, Gonzáles-Duarte & Cervera, 2007
In 2022 Babakina anadoni was found off the coast of the Isles of Scilly. Previously this rare 2cm long species was only known from a handful of specimins found along the west coast of Spain and further south in the Atlantic.

References 

Flabellinidae